Gastric vein may refer to:

 Left gastric vein
 Right gastric vein
 Short gastric veins